A malcontent is an early modern dramatic character type.

Malcontent(s) may also refer to:
 The Malcontent, a stage play by John Marston c.1603 
Malcontents (France), a political faction active between 1574 and 1576, during the French Wars of Religion
Malcontents (Low Countries), a political faction active between 1578 and 1579, during the Eighty Years' War